Aaron Nigel Armstrong (born 14 October 1977) is a track and field sprint athlete who competes internationally for Trinidad and Tobago. He is the 2008 Olympic champion in 4 × 100 metres relay.

Armstrong attended the University of Florida in Gainesville, Florida, where he ran for the Florida Gators track and field team in NCAA competition.  One of his first international medalling performances came at the 2005 Central American and Caribbean Championships: he won the 200 metres silver medal behind Usain Bolt and helped the Trinidad and Tobago team to the gold medal in the 4 x 100 metres relay.  He reached the quarter-finals of the 200 metres at the 2005 World Championships in Athletics and was sixth in the 2005 IAAF World Athletics Final.

He was selected to represent his country at the 2006 Commonwealth Games and finished in fifth place in the 200 metres final.  He helped his country retain the relay title at the 2008 Central American and Caribbean Championships, but he lost his place in the individual events to his national rivals Emmanuel Callender and Rondel Sorrillo (who won gold and silver).

Armstrong represented Trinidad and Tobago at the 2008 Summer Olympics in Beijing. He competed at the 4x100 metres relay together with Marc Burns, Keston Bledman and Richard Thompson. In their qualification heat they placed first in front of teams from Japan, the Netherlands and Brazil.  Their time of 38.26 was the fastest of all sixteen teams participating in the first round and they qualified for the final.  Armstrong was replaced by Emmanuel Callender for the final race and they sprinted to a time of 38.06 seconds, the second time after the Jamaican team, winning the silver medal. However, later on Jamaica were disqualified, and Trinidad and Tobago promoted to the gold medal. He also took part in the 200 metres individual, finishing first in his first round heat, with a time of 20.57 seconds. With 20.58 seconds in the second round he only placed fifth in his heat, which was not enough to qualify for the semi finals.

He ran in the 200 metres at the 2009 World Championships in Athletics in Berlin, but he was eliminated in the first heats stage (although his time of 21.38 was a season's best).  He took the bronze medal at the 2010 Commonwealth Games, finishing behind Lerone Clarke and Mark Lewis-Francis.

Personal bests 

100 m – 10.03 (2009)
200 m – 20.08 (1999)
400 m hurdles – 51.68 (2002)

See also 

 Florida Gators
 List of University of Florida Olympians

References

External links 
 
 

1977 births
Living people
Track and field athletes from Houston
Trinidad and Tobago male sprinters
Olympic athletes of Trinidad and Tobago
Athletes (track and field) at the 2008 Summer Olympics
Medalists at the 2008 Summer Olympics
Junior college men's track and field athletes in the United States
Commonwealth Games medallists in athletics
Athletes (track and field) at the 2006 Commonwealth Games
Athletes (track and field) at the 2010 Commonwealth Games
World Athletics Championships athletes for Trinidad and Tobago
Florida Gators men's track and field athletes
Commonwealth Games bronze medallists for Trinidad and Tobago
Olympic silver medalists in athletics (track and field)
Barton Cougars men's track and field athletes
Olympic gold medalists for Trinidad and Tobago
Medallists at the 2010 Commonwealth Games